The Yu-7 (from ) is a lightweight torpedo developed by the People's Republic of China. It entered service in the 1990s as the principal anti-submarine weapon of major People's Liberation Army Navy (PLAN) warships. The Yu-7 is a derivative of the Whitehead Alenia Sistemi Subacquei (WASS) A244/S torpedo.

Development
Development of an effective lightweight anti-submarine (ASW) torpedo for the PLAN began in the 1980s. The program was probably based on 40 A244/S torpedoes purchased for evaluation from Italy in 1987. Additional technology may have been reverse engineered from a United States Mark 46 Mod 2 torpedo recovered from the South China Sea in 1978 by Chinese fishermen. The torpedo was initially equipped with electric propulsion, but inadequate performance led to a redesign powered by Otto fuel II. Testing was carried out at the 750 Testing Range in Kunming up to 1988.

Description
The Yu-7 has contrarotating propellers. Aboard surface warships, it is fired from Type 7424 tripled 324 mm torpedo launchers; these are copies or derivatives of the WASS B515/ILAS-3.

Deployment
The Yu-7 entered service in the 1990s.

Yu-11
The Yu-11 is the successor to the Yu-7. It was first publicly identified in July 2015. The major improvement appears to be the pump-jet propulsor. The Yu-11 torpedo is quieter and may potentially operate at depths greater than 600 metres. The Yu-11 is longer, at three metres, and heavier than the Yu-7.

The Yu-11 is likely to become the standard PLAN lightweight torpedo and may have started equipping modern PLAN warships since 2012.

See also
 Export torpedoes of China
 APR-3E torpedo - Russian equivalent
 A244-S - Italian equivalent
 Mark 54 Lightweight Torpedo - US Navy's equivalent
 MU90 Impact - French/Italian equivalent
 Sting Ray (torpedo) - British equivalent
 TAL Shyena - Indian equivalent
 K745 Chung Sang Eo - South Korean equivalent
 Type 97 light weight torpedo (G-RX4) - Japanese equivalent

References

Torpedoes of China
Naval weaponry of the People's Republic of China
Aerial torpedoes
Military equipment introduced in the 1990s